Nautilus samoaensis is a species of nautilus native to the waters of American Samoa. It was described as a separate species in 2023.

References 

Nautiluses
Cephalopods of Oceania
Molluscs described in 2023